The 2007–08 San Jose Sharks season began on October 4, 2007. It was the San Jose Sharks' 17th season in the National Hockey League.  The Sharks were the Pacific Division champions, and second in the Western Conference.  They finished the season with a 49–23–10 record.

Preseason
During the pre-season, the 2007 NHL Entry Draft took place in Columbus, Ohio, on June 22–23. Additionally, the free agency period began on July 1.

 Green background indicates a win.
 Red background indicates a loss.

Regular season
The Sharks began a win streak of road games on November 14, 2007, when they beat the Dallas Stars with a shootout win. The Sharks went on to win nine more consecutive road games, which gave them 10 straight wins on the road.  The streak ended when the Sharks lost to the Anaheim Ducks on January 13, 2008. This was also the game where Head Coach Ron Wilson gave the Sharks' backup goaltender, Thomas Greiss, his first start and rested Evgeni Nabokov, who was the starting goaltender for all the other Sharks games played up until the All-Star break.

The Sharks' streak of ten-straight road wins was second to the 12 road game win streak posted by the Detroit Red Wings in 2006.

Jonathan Cheechoo earned his first hat-trick of the season on February 9, 2008 at the HP Pavilion against the Nashville Predators. This was the ninth time that Cheechoo earned a hat-trick in his career. The Sharks won the game 4–3 and gave Ron Wilson his 500th win as an NHL coach, the 11th coach in League history to reach the milestone.

The Sharks have continued with another win streak of 11 games at home and on the road. Since February 21, when the Sharks played the Philadelphia Flyers away in Philadelphia and won the game 3–1, they started their lengthy winning streak. On February 29, 2008, the Sharks played the Detroit Red Wings in Detroit and came across a 3–2 win on a controversial goal by Devin Setoguchi to push the winning streak to four consecutive games. San Jose played the Montreal Canadiens on March 3 in San Jose and pulled away with a 6–4 win to push their winning streak to six games. On March 5 in San Jose, they played the Ottawa Senators and pulled away with a winner in overtime by Patrick Marleau to push their winning streak to seven games.
The Sharks won the Pacific Division and finished second in the Western Conference.

The Sharks finished the regular season having allowed the fewest power-play goals, with 44, and with the best penalty-kill percentage (85.81%).

Divisional standings

Conference standings

Schedule and results

 Green background indicates win.
 Red background indicates regulation loss.
 White background indicates overtime/shootout loss.

Playoffs
On March 28, the Sharks clinched the Pacific Division title with a 3–1 win at Anaheim. The Sharks finished the regular season as the 2nd seed in the Western Conference. The Sharks began their first series, the Western Conference Quarter-finals, against the 7th seed Calgary Flames, losing the first game 3–2 but winning the second 2–0, tying the series at 1 win each. In the third game, the Sharks lost by a score of 4–3, falling back by 2 games to 1 game in the series. Game 4 saw Jonathan Cheechoo score the tying goal with just under five minutes to play in the third, and Joe Thornton scoring the game-winner with 9.4 seconds remaining in regulation to send the series back to San Jose tied at two games apiece. Back in San Jose for Game 5, the Flames' Jerome Iginla scored a 2nd period, 5-on-3 goal to give Calgary the first goal of the game, but the Sharks would score the next 4 goals and hang on for a 4–3 win for a 3–2 series lead. The Sharks showed poorly in Game 6, losing to Calgary in a shut-out, 2 -0, forcing Game 7. The Sharks played with Jeremy Roenick scoring twice and adding two assists to power the Sharks in a decisive 5–3 win over Calgary, clinching the series. The Sharks advanced to meet the Dallas Stars in Round 2 (Western Conference Semifinals) of the playoffs. In Game 1 of the Semifinals, the Sharks had a strong defensive showing at home, but lost in overtime to the Stars, 3–2, on a Brenden Morrow goal. After losing Games 2 & 3 and falling to a 3–0 deficit in the series, the Sharks won Game 4 in Dallas and Game 5 at home to force a Game 6 in Dallas. After playing into a fourth overtime period in the longest game in Sharks history (and 8th longest NHL game of all time), the Sharks season ended on a power play goal by the Stars' Brenden Morrow.

Playoffs

Player statistics

Regular season

Skaters

Note: GP = Games played; G = Goals; A = Assists; Pts = Points; +/- = Plus/minus; PIM = Penalty minutes

Goaltenders

Note: GP = Games played; TOI = Time on ice (minutes); W = Wins; L = Losses; OT = Overtime/shootout losses; GA = Goals against; SO = Shutouts; Sv% = Save percentage; GAA = Goals against average

Playoffs

Skaters
Note: GP = Games played; G = Goals; A = Assists; Pts = Points; +/- = Plus/minus; PIM = Penalty minutes

Goaltenders
Note: GP = Games played; TOI = Time on ice (minutes); W = Wins; L = Losses; GA = Goals against; SO = Shutouts; Sv% = Save percentage; GAA = Goals against average

Awards and records
The Sharks did not win any awards during the 2007–2008 NHL season.

Records

 Longest winning steak: 11 games
 Most PIM, single regulation game: Jody Shelley, 41
 Most points, single playoff game: Jeremy Roenick, 4
 Most games played: Evgeni Nabokov, 77
 Most goaltending wins: Evgeni Nabokov, 46
 Most consecutive starts: Evgeni Nabokov, 43

Milestones
 Jeremy Roenick played his 1,300th game.
 Ron Wilson won his 500th game as a coach.

Transactions
The Sharks were involved in the following transactions during the 2007–08 season.

Trades

Free agents signed

Free agents lost

Draft picks
San Jose's picks at the 2007 NHL Entry Draft in Columbus, Ohio.

Farm teams

Worcester Sharks
The Worcester Sharks were the San Jose Sharks' American Hockey League affiliate.

Phoenix RoadRunners
The Phoenix RoadRunners were the Sharks affiliate in the ECHL.

See also
 2007–08 NHL season

References

San Jose Sharks seasons
San Jose Sharks season, 2007-08
San Jose
San Jose Sharks
San Jose Sharks